Local elections were held in the United Kingdom on 7 May 1992, one month after the general election which returned the governing Conservative Party for a fourth consecutive term in office.  The Conservatives won back some ground that they had lost the previous year.

The Conservative Party gained 303 seats, bringing their number of councillors to 8,288.  Their share of the vote was projected to be 46%, their highest for many years.

The main opposition Labour Party lost 402 seats and were left with 9,102 councillors.  Their projected share of the vote was 30%, their lowest since 1982. Neil Kinnock was still party leader at this stage, although he had already declared his intention to resign from the position as soon as a new leader was elected; his successor was John Smith, who won the leadership contest against Bryan Gould on 18 July 1992.

The Liberal Democrats gained 56 seats and had 3,728 councillors after the elections.

Summary of results

England

Metropolitan boroughs
All 36 metropolitan borough councils had one third of their seats up for election.

District councils

Whole council
In one district the whole council was up for election as there were new ward boundaries, following a further electoral boundary review by the Local Government Boundary Commission for England.

Third of council
In 113 districts one third of the council was up for election.

Scotland

District councils

These were the last elections to the district councils before they were abolished by the Local Government etc. (Scotland) Act 1994.

References

Local elections 2006. House of Commons Library Research Paper 06/26.
Vote 1999 BBC News
Vote 2000 BBC News